The 2006 Men's Pacific Handball Cup was held in Sydney, Australia between May 25 and 27, 2006.

The competition participants host Australia, New Zealand, Cook Islands and New Caledonia.

Hosts Australia were the winners and undefeated all tournament. New Caledonia in the final were runners up followed by New Zealand and Cook Islands.

Results

Group results

Rankings

References

External links
 Archive on Tudor 66

Pacific Handball Cup
Pacific Handball Cup
2006 Pacific Handball Cup
2006 in Australian sport